Lake Lincoln State Park is a state park in the U.S. state of Mississippi.

Activities and amenities
The park features boating, swimming, waterskiing and fishing on  Lake Lincoln, overnight camping, as well as day-use. Park amenities include: recreational vehicle camping, vacation cabins and cottages, beach, picnic area with shelters, nature trail, playground, playing fields, boat launch, laundry facilities, disc golf, and worship services.

References

External links
Lake Lincoln State Park Mississippi Department of Fisheries, Wildlife, and Parks

State parks of Mississippi
Protected areas of Lincoln County, Mississippi